The Men's 25 metre standard pistol singles event took place at 13 October 2010 at the CRPF Campus.

Results

External links
Report

Shooting at the 2010 Commonwealth Games